Olenecamptus detzneri is a species of beetle in the family Cerambycidae. It was described by Kriesche in 1926. It contains the varietas Olenecamptus detzneri var. curvatomaculatus.

References

Dorcaschematini
Beetles described in 1926